Samuel Sotheby (31 August 1805 – 19 June 1861) was an English auctioneer and antiquary.

Background
He was born on 31 August 1805 in Hampstead, London, the son of Samuel Sotheby (1771–1842).

Career
The firm became Leigh, Sotheby, & Son in 1800, when John Sotheby's nephew Samuel joined it, and so continued till 1803. After 1803, and until the death of Leigh in 1815, the firm carried on their business at a new address, 145 Strand. John Sotheby died in 1807, and on Leigh's death, eight years later, Samuel continued the concern by himself, moving to 3 Waterloo Street, Strand, about 1817. Soon afterwards he took his son Samuel Leigh Sotheby into partnership, and in 1826 Messrs. Sotheby & Son printed a Catalogue of the Collections sold by Messrs. Baker, Leigh, & Sotheby from 1744 to 1826.

He died on 19 June 1861, drowning in the River Dart near Buckfastleigh, Devon.

References

1805 births
1861 deaths
English book and manuscript collectors
Burials at Brompton Cemetery
People from Hampstead
Businesspeople from London
Accidental deaths in England
Deaths by drowning in the United Kingdom
English auctioneers
Samuel Leigh
19th-century English businesspeople